A Gentleman of Leisure is a lost 1923 American silent comedy film produced by Famous Players-Lasky and distributed by Paramount Pictures. It was directed by Joseph Henabery and stars Jack Holt. The film is based on the 1910 novel A Gentleman of Leisure by P. G. Wodehouse. It was adapted into a play by Wodehouse and John Stapleton. It is also a remake of the 1915 film  A Gentleman of Leisure.

Cast
 Jack Holt as Robert Pitt
 Casson Ferguson as Sir Spencer Deever
 Sigrid Holmquist as Molly Creedon
 Alec B. Francis as Sir John Blount (credited as Alec Francis)
 Adele Farrington as Lady Blount
 Frank Nelson as Spike Mullen
 Alfred Allen as Big Phil Creedon
 Nadeen Paul as Maid
 Alice Queensberry as Chorus

See also
A Gentleman of Leisure (1915)

References

External links

Swedish language lobby poster

1923 films
American silent feature films
Lost American films
American films based on plays
Films based on works by P. G. Wodehouse
Films directed by Joseph Henabery
1923 comedy films
Silent American comedy films
American black-and-white films
1923 lost films
Lost comedy films
1920s American films